Carter Township may refer to:

 Carter Township, Ashley County, Arkansas
 Carter Township, Spencer County, Indiana
 Carter Township, Carter County, Missouri
 Carter Township, Burke County, North Dakota
 Carter Township, Tripp County, South Dakota

See also
Carter (disambiguation)

Township name disambiguation pages